Ziad Richa (born September 25, 1967) is a Lebanese skeet shooter who has represented his nation at the 2008 Summer Olympics in Beijing, where he finished twenty-ninth out of forty-one shooters in the men's skeet event. Richa was also the flag bearer at the opening ceremony. 

Richa served as the secretary general of the Lebanese Shooting Association.

References

1967 births
Olympic shooters of Lebanon
Lebanese male sport shooters
Shooters at the 2008 Summer Olympics
Living people
Shooters at the 2006 Asian Games
Shooters at the 2010 Asian Games
Asian Games competitors for Lebanon